Wang Yongzhi (born 17 November 1932) is a Chinese aerospace scientist and academician at the Chinese Academy of Engineering and a commissioner of the 11th National People's Political Consultative Conference. He is notable for serving as the general architect and designer of China's Shenzhou program from 1992 to 2006 overseeing the first six Shenzhou missions. In 2003, he was awarded the nation's highest scientific and technological prize, State Preeminent Science and Technology Award, by President Hu Jintao. Wang Yongzhi graduated from Moscow Aviation Institute in 1961.

Reference

External links
 Wang Yongzhi's info on the Chinese Academy of Engineering website

1932 births
Living people
Scientists from Liaoning
Space program of the People's Republic of China
Chinese aerospace engineers
Members of the Chinese Academy of Engineering
People from Tieling
Tsinghua University alumni
Moscow Aviation Institute alumni
Engineers from Liaoning